Conley "London" Parris (May 25, 1931 – September 7, 1992) was an American southern gospel bass singer, famous for his associations with The Blackwood Brothers and hit songs such as "Heaven Came Down".  He was inducted into the Southern Gospel Hall of Fame in 2004.

Biography and career

Conley Parris was born on May 25, 1931 in the United States.  Named “London” by Lee Roy Abernathy of The Homeland Harmony Quartet, he started singing gospel music in The Rebels Quartet when he replaced bass singer Big Jim Waits.

Parris joined Christian music pioneers The Blackwood Brothers in the late 1960s during their post-Sumner era.  With The Blackwood Brothers he released many albums and went on to win two Grammy Awards for Best Gospel Performance with their album In Gospel Country in 1969 at the 12th Annual Grammy Awards and again in 1972 for L-O-V-E at the 15th Annual Grammy Awards, the 1970 Album of the Year award for Fill My Cup, Lord at the 2nd GMA Dove Awards, and many other awards.

In 1971 he started his own group, London Parris and The Apostles, which won the Dove Award for the Most Promising New Gospel Talent at the 4th GMA Dove Awards in 1972.

Parris and his wife Yvonne had two sons, Christopher and David, and one daughter, Kathy.  He died on 7 September 1992.

Parris was a consummate performer with a large, booming bass voice and a dynamic personality that made him a crowd favorite.  He was famous for his renditions of "At the Crossing" and "Little Boy Lost", but "Heaven Came Down" and "Everybody Ought to Know" are his signature songs.

In 2004, he was posthumously inducted into the Southern Gospel Hall of Fame, operated at Dollywood, in Pigeon Forge, Tennessee, by the Southern Gospel Music Association.

Discography

As London Parris

As London Parris & the Goss Brothers

With The Blackwood Brothers Quartet

As London Parris and the Apostles

 
With Jackie Marshall

See also
 The Blackwood Brothers discography

References

External links

 

1931 births
1992 deaths
20th-century American singers
20th-century American male singers
American gospel singers
American basses
Place of birth missing
Place of death missing
Southern gospel performers